Trevor Josephson (born 31 January 1951) is a Canadian rower. He competed in the men's coxed pair event at the 1972 Summer Olympics.

References

1951 births
Living people
Canadian male rowers
Olympic rowers of Canada
Rowers at the 1972 Summer Olympics
Sportspeople from British Columbia
People from Princeton, British Columbia
20th-century Canadian people